Milt Jackson Quartet (also released as Soul Pioneers) is an album by American jazz vibraphonist Milt Jackson featuring performances recorded in 1955 and released on the Prestige label.

Reception

AllMusic writer Scott Yanow stated: "The music itself makes for an enjoyable straight-ahead set".

Track listing
All compositions by Milt Jackson, except where noted.
 "Wonder Why" (Nicholas Brodszky, Sammy Cahn) – 5:26
 "My Funny Valentine" (Lorenz Hart, Richard Rodgers) – 4:41
 "Moonray" (Paul Madison, Arthur Quenzer, Artie Shaw) – 5:05
 "The Nearness of You" (Hoagy Carmichael, Ned Washington) – 4:04
 "Stonewall" – 7:47
 "I Should Care" (Axel Stordahl, Paul Weston, Sammy Cahn) – 4:20
Recorded at the Van Gelder Studio, Hackensack, New Jersey on May 20, 1955

Personnel
Milt Jackson – vibes
Horace Silver – piano
Percy Heath – bass
Connie Kay  – drums

References

Prestige Records albums
Milt Jackson albums
1955 albums
Albums recorded at Van Gelder Studio